Alan Fraser Truscott (16 April 1925 – 4 September 2005) was a British-American bridge player, writer, and editor. He wrote the daily bridge column for The New York Times for 41 years, from 1964 to 2005, and served as Executive Editor for the first six editions of The Official Encyclopedia of Bridge from 1964 to 2002.

Britain 

Truscott was born in Brixton, south London, and showed early prowess at chess. He attended Whitgift School in Croydon and served in the Royal Navy for three years around the end of World War II. From 1947 he studied at the University of Oxford, which he represented at both chess and bridge. With Oxford partner Robert d'Unienville, he was on the British team (along with Terence Reese and Boris Schapiro) that won a bronze medal at the 1951 European Bridge League championships, age only 26. He represented Britain in the same event twice more, finishing second with partner Maurice Harrison-Gray in 1958 (again along with Reese–Schapiro) and first with partner Tony Priday in 1961. He was in charge of organising the 1961 rendition hosted by Torquay in Devonshire, England. As European champions that British team finished third in the 1962 Bermuda Bowl held in New York City. The 1961 European Teams was his only international championship outside the British Isles.

America 

According to Maureen Hiron, bridge columnist for The Independent of London, in New York City "he fell in love with one of the scorers, in particular, and America in general, and decided to cross the Atlantic."

Richard L. Frey, the American Contract Bridge League publications director, recruited Truscott to help edit the ACBL's membership magazine and its Official Encyclopedia of Bridge, whose first edition was underway. Truscott moved to New York City, then the ACBL headquarters, and succeeded Albert Morehead as bridge editor of The New York Times 1 January 1964. Truscott wrote a bridge column for The New York Times daily until March 1994, and then three times a week until April 2005, when he retired due to poor health, for a total of some 12,750 columns.

Frey, Truscott, and the editorial board led by Morehead completed the first edition of The Official Encyclopedia of Bridge in 1964. Truscott would be the executive editor of the encyclopedia until his death.

Alan Truscott had three children, Frances, Fraser and Philip, with his first wife, Gloria Gilling. That marriage was dissolved 1971 and in 1972 he married the American bridge expert and internationalist Dorothy Hayden, born Johnson, a former math teacher and actuary, who had four children from two previous marriages.

Alan Truscott wrote thirteen bridge books, including two with his wife, Dorothy, and one with Phillip Alder. He died of cancer at their vacation home in New Russia, New York, near Lake Champlain. His widow died the following year.

Buenos Aires affair

As New York Times correspondent, Truscott covered the 1965 contract bridge world championship Bermuda Bowl in Buenos Aires and became a chief witness in a cheating scandal where Terence Reese and Boris Schapiro, representing Europe, were accused of using their fingers to pass information about their cards. The initial accusers were the American partnership of B. Jay Becker and Dorothy Hayden; the two confided their suspicions to Truscott, a close friend of Hayden's (and later her husband), and to John Gerber, then captain of the USA team.  After an investigation, Reese and Schapiro were judged guilty by the World Bridge Federation authorities at the tournament in Buenos Aires.  The British Bridge League (BBL) convened its own inquiry, and next year judged them not guilty by the "reasonable doubt" standard.

Both Truscott and Reese published books on the affair, The Great Bridge Scandal and The Story of an Accusation.

Bridge accomplishments

Honors

 ACBL Hall of Fame, Blackwood Award 2001

Winner
 North American Bridge Championships (3)
 Mixed Pairs (1) 1989
 Master Mixed Teams (1) 1985
 North American Swiss Teams (1) 1987
 European Championships (1)
 Open Teams (1) 1961
 British Championships (2)
 Masters Individual (2) 1953, 1958

Runners-up
 North American Bridge Championships (2)
 Master Mixed Teams (1) 1972
 North American Swiss Teams (1) 1994
 European Championships (1)
 Open Teams (1) 1958

Publications
 The New York Times articles by Alan Truscott.
  224 pp.
  272 pp.
  232 pp. 
  32 pp.
  32 pp.
  32 pp.
  32 pp.
  32 pp.
  159 pp.
  99 to 133 pp.
  331 pp.
  26 pp.
  224 pp.
  252 to 260 pp.
  152 pp.
  133 pp.
  220 pp.
  (New York: Arco Pub. Co., 1996)
   (paper).
  236 pp.
  292 pp.
  399 pp.

References

External links
 
 
 
 

Obituaries 
 Alder, Phillip. "Dorothy Hayden Truscott, 80, Bridge Champion and Author, Is Dead". The New York Times, 7 July 2006. 
 Hiron, Maureen. "Alan Truscott, bridge player and columnist". The Independent, 10 September 2005. 
 Jourdain, P. D. "Alan Truscott (1925–2005)". English Bridge Union. 
 Pollak, Michael. "Alan Truscott, Times Bridge Editor Since 1964, Dies at 80". The New York Times, 5 September 2005. 
 "Alan Truscott". The Telegraph, 6 September 2005. 
 "Alan Truscott". TimesOnline – The Times, 9 September 2005. 

Games columns about Truscott
Bridge columns featuring Alan Truscott by his successor Phillip Alder:
Alder, Phillip."Bridge; A Life of Cards Began With a Missed Slam at 15" — biography with Alder's illustration of restricted choice, one subject of Truscott's original writings. The New York Times, 8 September 2005.
Alder, Phillip."BRIDGE; Playing in a European Fishbowl To Faintly Heard Applause" — biographical leftovers with one deal played by Truscott. The New York Times, 10 September 2005.
Chess column by his fellow Robert Byrne:
Byrne, Robert."Chess; Wary of 'Hotshot' Youngsters? Then Steer Clear of Radjabov" — friendly remarks by fellow columnist and recreational tennis player, with chess column that does not feature Truscott. The New York Times, 18 September 2005.

1925 births
2005 deaths
Contract bridge writers
British non-fiction writers
American contract bridge players
Bridge players from London
The New York Times columnists
People from Brixton
People educated at Whitgift School
Writers from New York City
British emigrants to the United States
Royal Navy personnel of World War II
American encyclopedists
British male writers
20th-century American non-fiction writers
Male non-fiction writers